is a 2008 film written and directed by Tatsuro Kashihara. The film premiered on January 1, 2008 in Japan. It was gravure idol Mami Yamasaki's first starring role in a film.

Synopsis
Doctor Koichiro Kiba's wife Sayoko takes a new job at the secret LIS Research Institute, but soon "collapses during the meeting, probably heart failure", and dies, or so we believe. It turns out that her personality was recorded and then put into another woman, Misono, a student who now has two personalities that take turns operating the body. She also develops super-human fighting skills as a "Persona." Several other characters also become Personas, part of a government plan for military use, though originally intended to preserve part of you after death.

Cast
 Mami Yamasaki
 Koji Moritsugu
 Kumiko Nakano
 Masato Hagiwara
 Akira Otaka
 Naoko Inoue
 Makoto Kai
 Yuichi Kimura
 Tôshirô Muraki
 Aimi Nakamura
 Maria Abe
 Satoshi Nikaido
 Naoya Ohshima
 Shirō Sano
 Sawa Suzuki
 Mariko Terada
 Takaki Uda

References

External links
 
  at the Wayback Machine

2008 films
2000s Japanese films